Business Today is an Indian fortnightly business magazine published by Living Media India Limited, in publication since 1992. Business Today Multiverse is a multifaceted media entity, with the many arms of the multiverse comprising a magazine, a website, television, YouTube, multiple social media channels, and an array of powerful event IPs. In February 2022, the magazine released a two-volume edition to celebrate its 30th anniversary.  After naming Udayan Mukherjee as its global business editor, the network has named prominent magazine editor, Sourav Majumdar, as the new editor of business today Magazine, and Siddharth Zarabi, former editor of Bloomberg TV, as the managing editor of Business Today TV.

Circulation 
Business Today has the highest circulation and readership amongst business magazines, and is also among the top 10 English-language magazines across genres. Business Today is published once a fortnight, and commands a readership base of 1.7 million readers.

Events 

Business Today events is a group of programmes that includes the signature BT MindRush and BT Best CEO Awards. The Most Powerful Women in Business is another signature event. Apart from these two, BT does events such as India@100 Economy Summit, Tech Conclave, Crypto Conclave, and many others.

Leadership 
In May 2021, India Today Group elevated Rahul Kanwal to the role of executive director of Business Today.

References

External links
 Official website

1992 establishments in India
Biweekly magazines published in India
India Today Group
Business magazines published in India
Magazines established in 1992
English-language magazines published in India